Democratic Alternative can refer to:

Democratic Alternative (Finland)
Democratic Alternative (Macedonia)
Democratic Alternative (Malta)
Democratic Alternative (Suriname)
Democratic Alternative (Colombia)
Democratic Alternative (Serbia)
Democratic Alternative (Nigeria)